Sheep Mountain is located in the U.S. state of Wyoming. The southern end of Sheep Mountain is above the tree line and consists of rocky cliffs that are referred to as the "Sleeping Indian" due to their appearance as viewed from Jackson Hole. Sheep Mountain is in the Gros Ventre Wilderness of Bridger–Teton National Forest. At the northern end of Sheep Mountain is the location of the Gros Ventre landslide.

In 1996, a U.S. Air Force C-130 cargo plane carrying an automobile and equipment outbound from Jackson Hole crashed into Sheep Mountain, killing a U.S. Secret Service agent and eight Air Force personnel. The cargo plane was transporting equipment to another destination after U.S. President Bill Clinton and his family had vacationed in Jackson Hole the previous week.

References

Mountains of Wyoming
Mountains of Teton County, Wyoming
Bridger–Teton National Forest